L'architecte textile is a 2017 French documentary feature film  directed by Mika'ela Fisher about sartorial art.

Plot
An in-depth documentary on the architecture of bespoke tailoring. Over the course of hundreds of hours the mistress tailor filmed herself while making a three-piece suit. This film is an open window into this sartorial craft.

Cast
Mika'ela Fisher herself: maître tailleur (Master tailor)
Renato Bianchi of the Comédie Française himself: maître d'essayage (Fitting master)

About the film
Documenting the intimate in sartorial art:

A mistress tailor films herself in the creative production of a three-piece suit : 
sketch, pattern, fabric, shaping, assembly, fitting, finalization - hundreds of (wo)man-hours, a story, a film... and an allegory.

Homage as essence

Art sartorial

Art Sartorial is maybe a forgotten or unknown term, but corresponds to the art of the Master Tailor. And this film wants to show in detail the knowledge and practice thus of the technique of this art.

Grand Couture

An avant-garde documentary that was fallen right in the middle of the Fashion Week, while the press attaches are boosting their crazy fashion designer on social networks and while the fashion bloggers and the hippest people in the world Planet rush at the foot of the catwalk.
L'architecte textile a perfect counterpoint, the precise work of a watchmaker in the space of the textile architect, who with his skillful hands structures and builds the garment that will sublimate the body by drawing clean lines, and, for the beauty of the gesture, sneak by the tip of the needle the pleats flying away at the slightest movement ...

A masterpiece of precision micro mechanics ... the Art of the Grand Couture.

Production
The original idea was to realize a school film for fashion students so that traditional couture survives and we do not forget the technique of sartorial art, which is disappearing. 
The first provisional version of the film is 10 hours long. Finally, a 100-minute cinema film has been created to give "non-professionals" the opportunity to experience this exclusive and increasingly rare profession. The film has a very avant-garde structure because of the type of camera work, the sound design and the editing of the film, so the film genre is difficult to reclassify. A mix of documentary, experimental film, feature film, cultural film and educational film.
A longer version of at least six hours is currently in post-production, which will be presented in museums and galleries in 2022.

Psychology of the film
The film begins and ends with quotations from Albert Camus' The Myth of Sisyphus:

" The struggle itself to the heights is enough to fill the heart of a man. One must imagine Sisyphus happy ".

"  At the far end of this sustained effort measured by space without sky and depthless time, the goal is reached ".
(The Myth of Sisyphus, Albert Camus, Gallimard, 1942)

Release
Following the premiere in France at Paris Fashion Week, L'architecte textile celebrates the German premiere during Berlin Fashion Week January 19, 2018 at Kino Babylon. On 17 February 2018 the film was screened at the Berlinale international film festival.
The premiere in United States has been the 30 Avril 2018 at the prestigious Newport Beach Film Festival.
On July 13, the film was presented in Warsaw at On Art Film Festival 2018 and won the On Art Award.
L'architecte textile will be part of the XIIth Florence Biennale 2019.

The film was critically acclaimed especially from professional trade magazines. 

 Die Fachzeitschrift für internationale Damenmode und Schnitt-Technik Rundschau-Verlag 90. Jahrgang 
 Die Fachzeitschrift für internationale Herrenmode und Schnitt-Technik Rundschau-Verlag  136. Jahrgang 
  De la mode au cinéma Mediapart

Reception
 Newport Beach Film Festival 2018 
 On Art Film Festival 2018 (Poland) 
 Sonoma International Film Festival 2019 
 Florence Biennale 2019 
 Arte Non Stop Film Festival 2020

Accolades

References

External links
 
 L'architecte textile Allocine
 L'Architecte textile Unifrance
 L'Architecte textile Chrysopras Films
 catalogue bnf L'architecte textile BnF
  L'Architecte textile Cinémathèque française
  l'architecte textile La cinémathèque du documentaire Ardèche Images

French documentary films
Documentary films about the arts
Biographical documentary films
French avant-garde and experimental films
Films directed by Mika'ela Fisher
2010s French-language films
2017 films
Textile arts
2010s avant-garde and experimental films
2010s French films